"Suzanne" is a song written by Canadian poet and musician Leonard Cohen in the 1960s. First published as a poem in 1966, it was recorded as a song by Judy Collins in the same year, and Cohen performed it as his debut single, from his 1967 album Songs of Leonard Cohen. Many other artists have recorded versions, and it has become one of the most covered songs in Cohen's catalogue. In 2021, it was ranked at No. 284 on Rolling Stone's "Top 500 Greatest Songs of All Time".

Background 
"Suzanne" was inspired by Cohen's platonic relationship with dancer Suzanne Verdal. Its lyrics describe the rituals that they enjoyed when they met: Suzanne would invite Cohen to visit her apartment by the harbour in Montreal, where she would serve him Constant Comment tea, and they would walk around Old Montreal past the church of Notre-Dame-de-Bon-Secours, where sailors were blessed before heading out to sea.

Verdal was interviewed by CBC News's The National in 2006 about the song. Verdal says that she and Cohen never had a sexual relationship, contrary to what some interpretations of the song suggest. Cohen stated in a 1994 BBC interview that he only imagined having sex with her, as there was neither the opportunity nor inclination to actually go through with it. She says she has met Cohen twice since the song's initial popularity: once after a concert Cohen performed in the 1970s and once in passing in the 1990s when she danced for him, but Cohen did not speak to her (and possibly did not recognise her). Verdal never benefited financially from the song's enormous commercial success. In introducing the song during his 1968 performance on the BBC, Cohen said he benefited only from his own performances of "Suzanne", having signed away his rights to the song itself in a legal document deceptively presented to him which he did not read.

Its lyrics first appeared as the poem "Suzanne Takes You Down" in Cohen's 1966 book of poetry Parasites of Heaven, admittedly because of lack of new material. Lyrics to a few other songs from his subsequent 1967 debut album were also printed in the book.

The song was on his debut album Songs of Leonard Cohen.  Cohen's recording was released as a single in 1968 but did not reach music charts. The song only charted after Cohen's death in 2016.

In popular culture

Film
Nick Cave performed the song in the film Leonard Cohen: I'm Your Man.

Other 
Martin Sharp wrote the lyrics for Cream's "Tales of Brave Ulysses" to the melody of this song, specifically the Judy Collins version. Eric Clapton later set Sharp's lyrics to his own music.

Charts

Certifications

Notable recordings 
The song "Suzanne" was first performed by The Stormy Clovers in 1966 and then recorded by Judy Collins, appearing on her 1966 album In My Life.

In 1967, Noel Harrison's version—the second cover of the song—reached number 125 in the Bubbling Under the Hot 100 chart on the week ending September 30. Harrison's version entered the Billboard Hot 100 chart at number 86 on October 28 and peaked at number 56 on November 25, 1967.

In 1969, Herman van Veen's Dutch version entered the Dutch Top 40 list at number 39 on April 26 and reached fourth place on May 31.

It has since been covered by many other artists, including a young Bruce Springsteen in his band the Castiles.

It has been translated in Italian by Fabrizio De André and included in his album Canzoni (1974).

The band R.E.M. gave Cohen a joint songwriting credit for their song "Hope" (on their 1998 album Up), in light of the similarity between the two songs.

References

External links 
 The song lyrics, from Leonard Cohen's web site (higher graphics)
 The song lyrics, from The Leonard Cohen Files (lower graphics)
 Rear-view Mirror: Who was "Suzanne" and why did Leonard Cohen make her famous? (CBC)
 Transcripted excerpt from the BBC Radio 4 FM, June 1998 interview with Suzanne Verdal McCallister

1967 songs
Columbia Records singles
Joan Baez songs
Judy Collins songs
Leonard Cohen songs
Nancy Wilson (jazz singer) songs
Nina Simone songs
Songs based on poems
Songs written by Leonard Cohen
Songs about Canada